Wreckin' 2004 is a collaborative studio album by American rappers and Screwed Up Click members Lil' Keke and Big Hawk. It was released on January 4, 2004 via Presidential Records. Its cover is a parody to the video game Madden NFL 2004.

Track listing

Chart positions

References

External links

 

2004 albums
Big Hawk albums
Lil' Keke albums
Collaborative albums